Aruvikkara  is a panchayat in Thiruvananthapuram district in the state of Kerala, India. It is located on the banks of the Karamana River 15 km from Thiruvananthapuram, the capital of the state of Kerala in South India and one of the 12 panchayats that shares border with Thiruvananthapuram Municipal Corporation. The reservoir and garden makes it a tourist spot. It is famous for the ancient Bhagavathi temple dedicated to Durga, the divine embodiment of female power, which is built on a rock. The stream in front of the temple contains large fishes, which are fed by the devotees visiting the shrine. The headquarters of the Wellington Water Distribution project is located here. The small Aruvikkara Dam (mini dam) which provides water to the state capital Thiruvananthapuram.
G Steephen of CPI(M) is the sitting MLA of Aruvikkara constituency to the Kerala Legislative Assembly.

Transportation
The Kerala State Road Transport Corporation (KSRTC) is the state-run bus company in Kerala, India. It is one of the oldest state run public bus transport services in India and is headquartered in Thiruvananthapuram. KSRTC bus is the only mode of Transportation available in Aruvikkara.

Demographics
 India census, Aruvikkara had a population of 32617 with 15939 males and 16678 females.

Politics 

Gallery

References

Tourist attractions in Thiruvananthapuram district
Villages in Thiruvananthapuram district